Polar code may refer to:

 International Code for Ships Operating in Polar Waters, an international code of safety for ships operating in polar waters
 Polar code (coding theory), a capacity-achieving error-correcting code